NetJets Inc. is an American company that sells fractional ownership shares in private business jets. 

Founded as Executive Jet Airways in 1964, it was later renamed Executive Jet Aviation. NetJets became the first private business jet charter and aircraft management company in the world. It launched its fractional ownership business in 1986 and became a subsidiary of Berkshire Hathaway in 1998.

History

1960s
The company was founded in 1964 and originally known as Executive Jet Airways. The name was later changed to Executive Jet Aviation (EJA), and again in 2002 to NetJets, after Berkshire Hathaway purchased it in 1998. NetJets was the first private business jet charter and aircraft management company in the world, launching its fractional ownership business in 1986. The founding members of the board of directors included US Air Force generals Curtis E. LeMay and Paul Tibbets, Washington lawyer and former military pilot Bruce Sundlun, and entertainers and pilots James Stewart and Arthur Godfrey, with retired Air Force Brigadier General Olbert F. "Dick" Lassiter serving as president and chairman of the board.

EJA initially began operations in 1964 with a fleet of ten Learjet 23 aircraft. Bruce Sundlun became EJA president in 1970, and Paul Tibbets became president in 1976.

1980s
In 1984, Executive Jet Aviation was purchased by mathematician and former Goldman Sachs executive Richard Santulli who owned a business that leased helicopters to service providers of offshore oil operations. When Santulli became chairman and CEO of the corporation, he closely examined 22 years of pilot logbooks, and began to envision a new economic model where several individuals could own one aircraft.

In 1987, the NetJets program was officially announced becoming the first fractional aircraft ownership format in history. Around the same time, painted on every NetJets US aircraft is a registration ending with QS, symbolizing the concept of selling quarter shares of an aircraft—a feature that is still representative of the NetJets brand today.

1990s
In 1998, Berkshire Hathaway acquired EJA and NetJets Inc from Richard Santulli for US$725 million, half of which was paid in stock. NetJets soon expanded to Europe and then Russia, and by 2006, it was the largest operator of business jets in Europe.

2000s
The company operated a fleet of nine Boeing 737-700 Boeing Business Jets in the mid-2000s, since then sold off.

In early August 2009, Santulli resigned as CEO and was replaced by David Sokol. Shortly afterward, NetJets moved its corporate headquarters from New Jersey back to its original home in Columbus, Ohio.

2010s
In 2010, NetJets acquired Marquis Jet from founders Jesse Itzler and Kenny Dichter. The prepaid Marquis Jet card allowed customers to purchase 25 hours of guaranteed flight time on the NetJets fleet.

On 11 June 2012, NetJets placed the largest aircraft order in private aviation history totaling US$17.6B. The company placed a firm order for 30 Bombardier Global 5000/6000 jets, 25 Bombardier Challenger 650 jets, 75 Bombardier Challenger 350s, 25 Cessna Citation Latitudes and 50 Embraer Phenom 300s. As a part of this purchase agreement, it also placed conditional orders for an additional 40 Bombardier Global 5000/6000s, 50 Bombardier Challenger 650, 125 Bombardier Challenger 350s, 125 Cessna Citation Latitudes and 75 Embraer Phenom 300s. As a result of these orders NetJets became Cessna's largest business jet fleet owner.

In September 2014, NetJets acquired approval to launch its aircraft charter service in China, having worked with Chinese authorities since 2012 to secure the operating certificate.

In 2015 the company's pilots picketed the Wynn resort in Las Vegas where company owner Warren Buffett was hosting some of his wealthiest customers. The event was symbolic of deteriorating labor relations within the company at this time.

The Internal Revenue Service (IRS) had sought back taxes and penalties of $643 million from NetJets for periods beginning in 2003, including on its maintenance and service fees. NetJets filed a lawsuit challenging the IRS assessments. In January 2015, the United States District Court issued a decision in NetJets' favor, holding that the IRS assessments were unlawful.

In 2019, a former NetJets pilot filed a lawsuit alleging that in March 2017, the company violated US Civil Right and Ohio anti-discrimination law when she was fired for being too short to properly control the rudders of an Embraer Phenom 300. She states that male pilots who were too tall were reassigned to different aircraft, while her employment was terminated without the opportunity to fly a different plane.

2020s
In the spring of 2020 the company saw a boom in demand, as wealthy individuals sought to avoid the risks of airline flying during the COVID-19 pandemic. Previously many potential customers had concerns about the optics of opulence and the environmental issues of private jet transport, but NetJets President of Sales, Marketing and Service, Patrick Gallagher noted in May 2020, that the health risks associated with flying on commercial airlines during the pandemic had trumped those concerns. The company introduced regular employee COVID-19 testing to try to contain the risks of an outbreak on its aircraft.

In October 2020 the company made initial moves to reduce its carbon footprint. The company committed to buying "up to 3 million gallons" (11.4 million litres) of sustainable aviation fuel to be used at two of its bases, San Francisco and Columbus, Ohio. The company is also encouraging its customers to buy carbon offsets for their flights. The company will also buy its own offsets for its administration and training flights.

As of November 2020 almost half of the company's fleet was manufactured by Textron, and the rest by Bombardier Inc. and Embraer. After reducing its delivery target for 2021 by more than half, due to decreased demand caused by the COVID-19 pandemic in 2020, the company expected to take delivery of 40 new aircraft in 2021 in anticipation of industry recovery.

In February 2021 the company purchased a stake in WasteFuel, a business that will convert landfill waste into sustainable aviation fuel (SAF). NetJets plans to purchase 100 million gallons of SAF from WasteFuel over the next 10 years as part of the deal.

In March 2021, NetJets announced that it had ordered 20 Aerion AS2s supersonic business jets. The memorandum of understanding between NetJets and Aerion called for the two companies to operate a larger "Aerion Connect" network. Aerion abruptly announced its closure on 21 May 2021, due to the inability to raise the needed capital to continue.

The company announced in March 2022, that it would partner with Lilium GmbH to establish an eVTOL network in Florida. NetJets will buy 150 Lilium Jets and operate them under a FAR Part 135 charter operation.

Subsidiaries
NetJets Europe, also known by its corporate legal name, NetJets Transportes Aéreos, S.A., was launched in 1996 as a sister company of NetJets and is now a subsidiary. It is based in Oeiras, Portugal, and serves more than 5,000 airports globally.

Also among NetJets subsidiaries is Executive Jet Management (EJM), based in Cincinnati, Ohio, which offers aircraft management and charter services. QS Partners is the whole-aircraft brokerage arm of NetJets, launched in 2016 and officing in Columbus, Ohio; Boulder, Colorado; and London; it also exclusively resells used aircraft from NetJets' fleet. QS Security Services was launched by NetJets in October 2019 with "tiered security packages" based on passenger needs and threat level at destination. Initially only available at Paris Le Bourget and in Mexico, future plans include worldwide coverage by 2023.

Business model

NetJets sells fractions of specific aircraft, chosen from several available types at the time of purchase. Owners then have guaranteed access (50–400 hours annually, depending on share size) to that aircraft with as little as four hours' notice. If the owner's aircraft is unavailable for some reason, another aircraft of the same type, or a larger aircraft, will be provided.

Fractional owners pay monthly maintenance fees for a minimum of 50 annual flight hours and a five-year commitment, as well as operating fees by the hour for use of aircraft. Alternatively, customers may buy flight hours in 25-hour increments by way of jet card programs. Fractional owners also pay an occupied hourly operating fee, but it is charged only when an owner or guest is on board, not for ferry flights.

NetJets is the largest fractional aircraft provider. In 2021 its fleet flew 478,444 hours.

For companies or individuals that require less than the minimum 50 flight hours and the five-year commitment of fractional ownership, they can buy flight hours in 25-hour increments via the NetJets jet card programs.

Fleet

NetJets is the largest private jet operator in the world. The NetJets fleet :

As of July 2022, NetJets' global fleet included more than 600 aircraft.

Accidents and incidents

See also
AirSprint
Air taxi
Flexjet
Fractional ownership of aircraft
List of charter airlines
PlaneSense
VistaJet
Wheels Up

References

External links 

 

Airlines established in 1964
American companies established in 1964
Airlines based in Ohio
Berkshire Hathaway
Companies based in the Columbus, Ohio metropolitan area
Fractional aircraft ownership companies
Air charter
Arthur Godfrey